The Robert F. Lytle House is a house located in northeast Portland, Oregon, listed on the National Register of Historic Places.  The architect was David L. Williams.  The interior includes stained-glass windows by Povey Brothers Glass Company.

See also
 National Register of Historic Places listings in Northeast Portland, Oregon

References

1912 establishments in Oregon
Houses completed in 1912
Houses on the National Register of Historic Places in Portland, Oregon
Irvington, Portland, Oregon
Neoclassical architecture in Oregon
Portland Historic Landmarks